Geijera linearifolia, commonly known as oilbush or sheepbush, is a species of shrub in the family Rutaceae and is endemic to southern Australia. It has simple linear to oblong leaves, much-branched cymes of greenish-white flowers, and fruit containing a shiny black seed.

Description

Taxonomy
Oilbush was first formally described in 1824 by de Candolle who gave it the name Eriostemon linearifolius and published the description in his treatise Prodromus Systematis Naturalis Regni Vegetabilis. In 1924, John McConnell Black changed the name to Geijera linearifolia.

Distribution and habitatGeijera linearifolia grows on rocky limestone on flats and around the edge of salt lakes in woodland and dry scrub. It occurs between Lake Kirk (between Norseman and Dundas) in central-southern Western Australia and the Murray River in South Australia.

Conservation statusGeijera linearifolia'' is classified as "not threatened" by the Government of Western Australia Department of Parks and Wildlife.

References

linearifolia
Flora of South Australia
Flora of Western Australia
Taxa named by Augustin Pyramus de Candolle
Plants described in 1824